This is an incomplete list of people who have served as Lord Lieutenant for Powys. Prior to 1974, the Monarch was represented in the area by the Lord Lieutenant of Montgomeryshire, the Lord Lieutenant of Radnorshire and the Lord Lieutenant of Brecknockshire.
Col. John Lyon Corbett-Winder, O.B.E., M.C., 1 April 1974– (formerly Lord Lieutenant of Montgomeryshire), with two lieutenants:
Captain Nevill Glanville Garnons Williams, M.B.E., R.N. (Retd.), 1 April 1974– (formerly Lord Lieutenant of Breconshire)
Brigadier Sir Charles Michael Dillwyn-Venables-LLewelyn, Bt., M.V.O., 1 April 1974– (formerly Lord Lieutenant of Radnorshire)
Mervyn Leigh Bourdillon, 1986–1998
The Hon. Dame  Elizabeth Shân Legge-Bourke D.C.V.O, 1998–2018
Mrs Tia C Jones,  10 September 2018 – present

References

 
Powys
1974 establishments in Wales